Papamichael is a Greek surname. Notable people with the surname include:

Constantinos Papamichael (born 1993), Cypriot alpine skier
Dimitris Papamichael (1934–2004), Greek actor
Gregorios Papamichael (1875–1956), Greek theologian and writer
Phedon Papamichael (born 1962), Greek cinematographer and film director

Greek-language surnames
Surnames